Petro Dode (born 17 April 1924, date of death unknown) was an Albanian politician. He served as Chairman of the Assembly of the Republic of Albania from 19 February 1987 to 17 April 1990.

Dode was a party functionary. He authored technical and political books, such as: 20 Vjet Shqipëri socialiste (20 years of Socialist Albania) in 1964, Revizionizmi jugosllav dhe pasojat e tij në ekonominë bujqësore të Jugosllavisë (Yugoslav revisionism and its effects on the Yugoslav agricultural economy) of 1962, and Probleme të planifikimit dhe të zhvillimit ekonomisë bujqësore në RPSH (Topics on planning and agricultural economy development in the PSR of Albania) of 1965.

In addition, he was also first candidate of the Central Committee (CC) of the Labour Party of Albania (PPSh).

In 1966, he was first-deputy of the People's Assembly (Alb: Kuvendi Popullor). Dode was member of the parliament from the sixth to the end of the eleventh legislative term ending in 1991.

After the demise of Abdyl Këllezi, he succeeded on 1 September 1975 as Deputy Chairman of the Council of Ministers led by Prime Minister Mehmet Shehu, position he held until January 14, 1982. At the same time, on 1 September 1975, Dode also succeeded Këllezi as Chairman of the State Planning Commission until 23 November 1982. He was succeeded by Harilla Papajorgji as Chairman of the State Planning Commission in the Çarçani II Government.

On February 19, 1987, he was elected President of the People's Assembly of the People's Socialist Republic of Albania, position previously held by Pali Miska. He held this position until 17 April 1990 and was therefore the last officeholder of the position of President of the People's Assembly of the People's Republic of Albania.

References

1924 births
Year of death missing
20th-century Albanian politicians
Labour Party of Albania politicians
Speakers of the Parliament of Albania
Members of the Parliament of Albania
Government ministers of Albania
Deputy Prime Ministers of Albania
People from Ersekë
Albanian communists
Communism in Albania